İnler, Polatlı is a village in the District of Polatlı, Ankara Province, Turkey. The village had a population of 375 in 2020. It is located 115 km from Ankara province and 45 km from Polatlı district. The village is populated by Kurds.

References

Villages in Polatlı District
Kurdish settlements in Ankara Province